The 1898–99 Yale Bulldogs men's ice hockey season was the 4th season of play for the program.

Season
Yale finished the season undefeated, with a 6–0–0 record. They were declared as Champions of the Intercollegiate Hockey League, a loose association of existing college programs.

The team did not have a coach, however, G.S. Mittendorf served as team manager.

Roster

Standings

Schedule and Results

|-
!colspan=12 style="color:white; background:#00356B" | Regular Season

References

Yale Bulldogs men's ice hockey seasons
Yale
Yale
Yale
Yale